Super Billy or Super Bili is a Bosnian animated television series created by Berin Tuzlić. Super Billy was aired on BHT 1 and Cartoon Network.

Cast 
 Amra Kapidžić as Super Bili/Lili/Čili
 Enis Bešlagić as Žlof
 Aleksandar Seksan as Buco
 Semir Krivić as Kobajagi
 Alban Ukaj as Baka (Grandma)

External links 
 SloCartoon.net

Bosnia and Herzegovina animated television series
2000s Bosnia and Herzegovina television series